Castoria may refer to :

Places and jurisdictions 
 Kastoria, city in West Macedonia, Greece, also a Greek Orthodox Metropolitan see.
 Kastoria (regional unit), regional unit in West Macedonia, Greece
 Castoria (Latin see), city and bishopric in Graecia Secunda
 A previous name for French Camp, California

Other 
 Fletcher's Castoria, now known as Fletcher's Laxative, an oral syrup containing a stimulant laxative

See also
 Castorina, a surname